The 2017–18 Nemzeti Bajnokság I (known as the K&H férfi kézilabda liga for sponsorship reasons) is the 67th season of the Nemzeti Bajnokság I, Hungarian premier Handball league.

Teams 
As in the previous season, 14 teams played in the 2017–18 season.
After the 2016–17 season, Balmazújvárosi KK and Mezőkövesdi KC were relegated to the 2017–18 Nemzeti Bajnokság I/B. They were replaced by two clubs from the 2016–17 Nemzeti Bajnokság I/B, Ferencvárosi TC and Dabas VSE KC.

Personnel and kits
Following is the list of clubs competing in 2017–18 Nemzeti Bajnokság I, with their president, head coach, kit manufacturer and shirt sponsor.

Managerial changes

League table

Schedule and results
In the table below the home teams are listed on the left and the away teams along the top.

Finals

Game 1

Game 2

MOL-Pick Szeged won the Finals, 58–57 on aggregate.

Season statistics

Top goalscorers

Attendances

Updated to games played on 7 May 2018.
Source: League matches: NB I 2017/2018
Attendance numbers without playoff matches.

Notes
1: Team played last season in Nemzeti Bajnokság I/B.

Number of teams by counties

See also
 2017–18 Magyar Kupa
 2017–18 Nemzeti Bajnokság I/B
 2017–18 Nemzeti Bajnokság II

References

External links
 Hungarian Handball Federaration 
 hetmeteres.hu

Nemzeti Bajnokság I (men's handball)
2017–18 domestic handball leagues
Nemzeti Bajnoksag I Men